The Popestar Tour was a concert tour by Swedish rock band Ghost in support of their second EP, Popestar. The EP was released on September 16, which coincided with the first show of the tour in Rochester, New York. They toured Europe in the spring of 2017, followed by a tour as openers for Iron Maiden.

During the final show on September 30, 2017, Papa Emeritus III was dragged off stage during the final song. A new incarnation called "Papa Emeritus Zero" was introduced on stage, later named "Papa Nihil".

Setlist 
This is a sample setlist from the beginning of their tour at the Main Street Armory in Rochester, New York. It does not represent the shows that followed afterwards.
 "Masked Ball" (intro)
 "Square Hammer"
 "From the Pinnacle to the Pit"
 "Secular Haze"
 "Stand by Him"
 "Con Clavi Con Dio"
 "Per Aspera ad Inferi"
 "Body and Blood"
 "Devil Church"
 "Cirice"
 "Year Zero"
 "Spöksonat"
 "He Is"
 "Absolution"
 "Mummy Dust"
 "Ghuleh / Zombie Queen"
 "Ritual"
 "Monstrance Clock"

Their cover of Imperiet's "Bible" was performed with a choir at their Stockholm show on April 28, 2017. A 20-piece children's choir also joined them for "Monstrance Clock" at the end of their Bloodstock Festival show on August 12, 2017.

"Elizabeth" & "Deus in Absentia" were played on the final two shows of the tour in Stockholm and Gothenburg.

Opening act for Iron Maiden 
The following setlist was taken from the June 11, 2017 performance at the Amalie Arena in Tampa, Florida when the band was opening for Iron Maiden on the latter's The Book of Souls World Tour.

 "Masked Ball" (intro)
 "Square Hammer"
 "From the Pinnacle to the Pit"
 "Cirice"
 "Ritual"
 "Year Zero"
 "Absolution"
 "Mummy Dust"
 "Monstrance Clock"

Tour dates

Box office

Opening bands 
 Marissa Nadler - Metroplex, Little Rock (October 31, 2016)
 Kvelertak - Gröna Lund, Stockholm (September 29, 2017)

References 
Notes

References

Ghost (Swedish band) concert tours
2016 concert tours
2017 concert tours